Yours Always is a 1991 compilation album by country singer Willie Nelson.

Track listing 
"Always on My Mind" (Johnny Christopher, Mark James, Wayne Carson Thompson)- 3:31
"I Never Go Around Mirrors (I've Got a Heartache to Hide)" (Lefty Frizzell, Sanger D. Schafer) - 2:33
"Why Are You Picking on Me?" (Willie Nelson) - 2:27
"Help Me Make It Through the Night" (Fred Foster, Kris Kristofferson) - 3:58
"Angel Flying Too Close to the Ground" (Willie Nelson) - 4:24
"Mona Lisa" (Ray Evans, Jay Livingston) - 2:31
"I'm Not Trying to Forget You" (Willie Nelson) - 3:18
"If You've Got the Money (I've Got the Time)" (Jim Beck, Lefty Frizzell) - 2:03
"It's Not Supposed to Be That Way" (Willie Nelson) - 3:20
"City of New Orleans" (Steve Goodman) - 4:49

Personnel
Willie Nelson – Guitar, vocals

References

1991 compilation albums
Willie Nelson compilation albums